"Love Games", written and composed by Paul Curtis and Graham Sacher, was the 's entry at the Eurovision Song Contest 1984, performed by the trio Belle and the Devotions, which was headed by Kit Rolfe.

Belle and the Devotions won the right to perform at Luxembourg by winning the UK national final, A Song for Europe, where they were the fourth act to perform. In Luxembourg, the song was performed sixth on the night, following 's Dollie de Luxe with "Lenge leve livet" and preceding ' Andy Paul with "Anna Maria Lena". At the end of judging that evening, "Love Games" took the seventh-place slot with 63 points.

The song was an homage to the girl group sound of 1960s Motown, with the girls lamenting that their lovers had "played love games" with them and broken their hearts. The trio was dressed in bright day-glo coloured jackets and miniskirts, with similarly eye-popping hair (Rolfe went for a platinum blonde, while the other singers dyed their hair yellow and bright red, respectively).

At the end of their performance, some cheers in the audience were met with boos, as many people in Luxembourg were still upset with the United Kingdom after English football fans rioted in the country as a result of being knocked out of the European Championship the previous November.

After Eurovision, the song peaked at No. 11 on the UK Singles Chart.

The 7" single runs to 3:16. The 12" single is an extended version and runs to 4:51. The 12" version has yet to be made available on CD.

Charts

References

1984 songs
1984 singles
1984 in British music
Eurovision songs of the United Kingdom
Eurovision songs of 1984
Songs written by Paul Curtis (musician)
CBS Records singles
Songs about heartache